Jesper Højer (born 5 September 1978) is a Danish businessman. He was the CEO of the Lidl supermarket discount chain, from 2017 to 2019. His main reason for departure of the role, is to spend more time with his family. He succeeded Sven Seidel.

Prior to his appointment as CEO, Højer had been head of the business in Belgium and then head of its international buying operation, and had worked for Lidl for over ten years.

References

1978 births
Living people